Stephen Cohen (born September 30, 1982) is an American computer scientist and entrepreneur. He is best known as a co-founder and the president of Palantir Technologies, a platform for analyzing integration and visualizing data used by governments and businesses. He is credited with creating the initial prototype of Palantir in eight weeks. Since then, he has interviewed over 4,500 candidates and continues to be actively involved in Palantir. Previously to Palantir, Cohen worked with Peter Thiel at Clarium Capital. He also served as an adviser to Backtype prior to its acquisition by Twitter in 2011.

Education
Cohen graduated from Stanford University with a BSc in computer science in 2005. While at Stanford he focused on machine learning, artificial intelligence, and natural language processing and did research with professor Andrew Ng, director of the Stanford Artificial Intelligence Lab.

References

Stanford University alumni
American computer scientists
21st-century American businesspeople
1982 births
Living people
Jewish American scientists
21st-century American Jews